Al Hugayet Tower is the tallest building in Khobar, Saudi Arabia.

References

Residential skyscrapers in Saudi Arabia
Skyscraper office buildings in Saudi Arabia